John William Winfield (27 October 1907 – January 1991) was an English long-distance runner who competed in the 1930 British Empire Games.

He was born in Stanley Common.

At 1930 Empire Games he won the bronze medal in the 3 miles event. In the 6 miles competition he finished seventh.

References
Jack Winfield - He just kept running

1907 births
1991 deaths
People from the Borough of Erewash
Sportspeople from Derbyshire
English male long-distance runners
Commonwealth Games bronze medallists for England
Commonwealth Games medallists in athletics
Athletes (track and field) at the 1930 British Empire Games
Medallists at the 1930 British Empire Games